Jalan Ayer Panas (Johor state route ) is a major road in Johor state, Malaysia.

List of junctions

Roads in Johor